The Ajmer rape case involved the serial rapes and blackmailing of girls by local gang in Ajmer, Rajasthan in 1992. It is one of sexual exploitation scandals. The scandal involved young girls. The news of the scandal broke after a local paper, ‘Dainik Navajyoti’ published some nude images and a story about school students being blackmailed by local gangs.

The investigation of the case was stalled by police under political pressure as the main accused, Farooq Chishtee, belonging to the Khadims of Ajmer Sharif Dargah, was president of the Ajmer Indian Youth Congress. Eventually, 18 serial offenders were charged in court. 8 were convicted for life and 4 among them were later acquitted in 2001. In 2007, a fast track court in Ajmer convicted Farooq Chishti, but in 2013, Rajasthan High Court released him on time served.

"The accused were in a position of influence, both socially and financially, and that made it even more difficult to persuade the girls to come forward and depose," says retired Rajasthan D.G.P. Omendra Bhardwaj, who was then posted as the Deputy Inspector General of Police, Ajmer. The Supreme Court noted in this case, "Unfortunately many of the victims who appeared as witnesses turned hostile and one can appreciate the reason why they did not want to depose against the appellants as that would have exposed them as well, and would have adversely affected their future life." The case has been compared to the Rotherham child sexual exploitation scandal.

Incident 
The blackmail operation was discovered to be a chain of serial offenders. A specific group of local influential men was targeting young girls. First, Farooq Chistee trapped one of the girls from Sophia Senior Secondary School in Ajmer and took obscene photos of her. Then the accused blackmailed the girl into introducing them to her classmates and friends. Eventually, other girls would be raped, sexually exploited, and have their pictures taken at a farmhouse. The cycle continued so forth. The gang continued to expand its operations and victimize an increasing number of girls. They photographed the girls in compromising positions, using the images to exploit the victims.

Investigation 
The editor of Navjyoti, Deenbandhu Chaudhary, had admitted that the local law enforcement authorities were aware of the scandal almost since a year before the story broke, but they allowed the local politicians to stall the investigations.

Chaudhary stated that they finally decided to go ahead with the story because that seemed to be the only way to prod the local administration into action. Finally, the police lodged an FIR against eight of the accused. Further investigations led to 18 men in total being charged and tensions ran high in the town for several days.

People took to the streets to protest and tension in the community grew. A three-day bandh was imposed and subsequent news of the widespread exploitation and blackmail started coming in. Retired Rajasthan DGP Omendra Bhardwaj, who was the Deputy Inspector General of Police in Ajmer at that time, stated that the social and financial aristocracy of the accused stopped many more victims from coming forward. Another grim realization was that many of the victims, being young and vulnerable, had already committed suicide.

The case is still far from being closed. Many victims who were supposed to be witnesses turned hostile. The number of victims was believed to be several hundred.

The Rajasthan police's Special Operations Group (SOG) arrested Saiyed Saleem Chishtee, 42, one of the accused from Khalid Mohalla in Ajmer town on 4 January 2012.

Accused charged 
All of the 19 accused were charged with abduction. The main accused Farooq Chishtee was President of the Ajmer Youth Congress. Nafis Chishtee was the Vice-President of Ajmer Indian National Congress and Anwar Chishtee was the Joint Secretary of Ajmer Indian National Congress. Moijullah (alias Puttan), Ishrat Ali, Anwar Chishtee, and Shamshuddin (alias Meradona) were also sentenced by the court. Absconder Suhail Chishtee hid for 26 years before surrendering. Absconder Salim Chishtee was arrested in 2012. Another main accused, Alamas, is still a fugitive.

Trial 
According to the police and women-focused NGOs, it was difficult to build a case against the perpetrators, as most victims were reluctant to come forward. However, the photographs and videos used to blackmail the victims helped identify the accused and build the case against them.

Thirty victims were identified in the investigations. Out of these, only about a dozen filed cases, and ten later backed out. Only two victims pursued the case. Of the 18 accused who were charged with abduction and gang rape under the Indian Penal Code and Indecent Representation of Women, one has since committed suicide. In 2013, the Rajasthan High Court upheld the decision though it reduced the period of the sentence from life imprisonment to the period already served by him.

In 2004, the Supreme Court dismissed both appeals filed by the state, as well as the convicts. A bench comprising Justice N. Santosh Hegde and Justice BP Singh said, "Having regard to the facts and circumstances of the case, we are of the view that the ends of justice would be met if the sentence is reduced to ten years rigorous imprisonment."

Victims 
After the rape, most victims experienced harassment and threats, with no support from society or their families. According to police investigations, about 6 victims allegedly committed suicide. Ajmer Mahila Samooh, who tried to take up the victim's cause, withdrew after receiving threats. Small-time tabloids were quite a sensation in Ajmer at that time. Many victims were even allegedly blackmailed further by these tabloids and local papers. They had access to the explicit images of the girls, and the owners and publishers sought money from the families of the girls to keep them hidden.

With every surrendering, sentencing, or any other development in the case (even after 30 years since the incident), the survivors had to return to court, causing them to relive the horror over and over.

Aftermath 
The incident shocked the entire country. People took to the streets to protest and communal tension grew. A three-day bandh was observed and much subsequent news of the widespread exploitation and blackmail started coming in. The police were also criticized for not acting even after having information about the ongoing sexual abuse. It had also stalled the case because the local politicians warned action against the accused would lead to massive community tension.

Musabbir Hussain, Joint Secretary of the Anjuman Committee which oversees the Ajmer Dargah, told Indian Express, "It’s a case that nobody in Ajmer wants to talk about because of the nature of the crime. It’s a blot on our city’s history."

See also 
Rape in India
List of scandals in India
Love jihad
Religious persecution

References

Sources
 

Gang rape in India
Violence against women in India
Scandals in India
Corruption in India
Sex scandals
Crime in Rajasthan
1992 crimes in India
History of Ajmer
Incidents of violence against girls